"Pónmela" is the second single by Puerto Rican reggaetonero Voltio, released in January 2008, by Sony BMG. It features reggaeton duo Jowell & Randy. The song is also featured in the game Grand Theft Auto IV.

Music video
A video was released in late January 2008. It features Voltio and Jowell & Randy.

Chart positions

References

2008 singles
Julio Voltio songs
2008 songs
Sony BMG Norte singles